The women's shot put event at the 1986 World Junior Championships in Athletics was held in Athens, Greece, at Olympic Stadium on 16 and 17 July.

Medalists

Results

Final
17 July

Qualifications
16 Jul

Group A

Participation
According to an unofficial count, 16 athletes from 10 countries participated in the event.

References

Shot put
Shot put at the World Athletics U20 Championships